Altamont Hotel is a historic hotel located at Fayetteville, Fayette County, West Virginia. It was built in 1897–1898, and is a 2 1/2 story, "T"-shaped brick building on a raised basement. It features a gently sloping hipped roof and wraparound Victorian verandah.  In the 1930s, it was adapted for apartment use.

It was listed on the National Register of Historic Places in 1979.

References

Hotel buildings on the National Register of Historic Places in West Virginia
Hotel buildings completed in 1898
Buildings and structures in Fayette County, West Virginia
National Register of Historic Places in Fayette County, West Virginia
Victorian architecture in West Virginia
Defunct hotels in West Virginia
Apartment buildings in West Virginia
1898 establishments in West Virginia
Fayetteville, West Virginia